Harlow Wilcox may refer to:
Harlow Wilcox (musician) (1943–2002), American musician
Harlow Wilcox (announcer) (1900–1960), American radio announcer